Jon Michael Roehlk (June 25, 1961 – March 13, 2016) was an Arena football offensive/defensive lineman in the Arena Football League (AFL). He played college football at the University of Iowa.

In 1999, Roehlk was elected into the Arena Football Hall of Fame. He died in 2016 after a period of declining health. Roehlk was survived by his brothers Former Hawkeye Football Player and Former Durant Track Coach, Phil Roehlk and Anthony Roehlk.

References

External links
Pro-Football-Reference.com

1961 births
American football offensive linemen
American football defensive linemen
Iowa Hawkeyes football players
Washington Commandos players
Chicago Bears players
Detroit Drive players
National Football League replacement players
Miami Hooters players
Iowa Barnstormers players
2016 deaths